Mysteries (1892) is the second novel by Norwegian author Knut Hamsun.

Plot
The community of a small Norwegian coastal town is shaken by the arrival of eccentric stranger Johan Nagel, who proceeds to shock, bewilder, and beguile its bourgeois inhabitants with his bizarre behavior, feverish rants, and uncompromising self-revelations.

Publication
The novel was originally published in Norwegian in Norway in 1892. In 1922, Knopf published the first English translation, a bowdlerized translation by Arthur G. Chater. Another translation by Gerry Bothmer was published by Farrar, Straus and Giroux in 1971, with an afterword by Isaac Bashevis Singer, who said, "The whole school of fiction in the 20th century stems from Hamsun." Mysteries is said to have "the shape and spirit of the modern novel, produced at a time when the modern novel did not yet exist". Penguin published a third translation into English by Sverre Lyngstad in 2001.

The novel inspired Paul Juon to write his tone-poem for cello and orchestra, "Mysteries" op.59, written in 1914 and published in 1928. 

The 1978 film Mysteries was based on the novel.

References

1892 Norwegian novels
Novels by Knut Hamsun
Modernist novels
Psychological novels
Novels set in Norway